Strange Stories is a 30-minute American television supernatural anthology series which was hosted by Edward Arnold and aired in first-run syndication in 1956.

Guest stars included Brian Keith, Vera Miles, Charles Coburn, Spring Byington, and DeForest Kelley.

External links
Strange Stories at CVTA

1950s American anthology television series
1956 American television series debuts
1956 American television series endings
First-run syndicated television programs in the United States